Dorsa Dana is a wrinkle ridge at  in Mare Smythii on the Moon. It is 82 km long and was named after American geologist James Dwight Dana in 1976.

References

Dana